Leola is a census-designated place (CDP) in Lancaster County, Pennsylvania, United States. It includes the unincorporated communities of Leola, Leacock, and Bareville, and prior to 2010 was known as the Leacock-Leola-Bareville census-designated place. Originally named "Mechanicsburg", its present name is a portmanteau of "Leacock" and the "Glenola" train station that once served the town. As of the 2010 census, the population of the CDP was 7,214.

Demographics

Geography and climate
Leola is in central Lancaster County, primarily in Upper Leacock Township, and extending east into the southern corner of West Earl Township. The community of Leacock is in the western part of the CDP, Leola is in the center, and Bareville is in the east. The small community of Groffdale is in the farthest east part of the CDP. New Holland Pike (Pennsylvania Route 23) runs the length of the community, leading west  to the city of Lancaster, the county seat, and east  to the borough of New Holland. 

The communities lie atop a low east-west trending ridge, draining north via tributaries of Groff Creek to the Conestoga River and draining south to Mill Creek, a west-flowing tributary of the Conestoga, which leads to the Susquehanna.

The local hardiness zone is 6b.

References

Census-designated places in Lancaster County, Pennsylvania
Census-designated places in Pennsylvania